WULK 94.7 FM is a radio station licensed to Crawfordville, Georgia.  The station broadcasts a country music format and is owned by Paul and Suzanne Stone's Southern Broadcasting, through licensee Wyche Services Corporation.

References

External links

ULK
Country radio stations in the United States
Radio stations established in 2012
2012 establishments in Georgia (U.S. state)